Antártida is the soundtrack album by Welsh multi-instrumentalist and composer John Cale. It was released in September 1995 on Belgian independent label Les Disques du Crépuscule. It is the original music score for Manuel Huerga's film Antártida. On this album played several musicians, such as Sterling Morrison and Maureen Tucker from The Velvet Underground and Cale's collaborators Chris Spedding, Erik Sanko and David Soldier. It also featured one song ("Antarctica Starts Here") from Cale's 1973 album Paris 1919.

Track listing 
All tracks composed by John Cale, except where indicated.
"Flashback 1 Does Not Equal 1" − 1:27
"Antártida" − 3:05
"Velasco's Theme" − 1:14
"Maria's Appartement" − 1:06
"Flashback 1 Does Not Equal 2" − 1:27
"On the Waterfront" − 3:15
"Pasodoble Mortal" − 3:43
"Maria's Dream" − 1:08
"Bath" − 5:02
"Flashback 1 Does Not Equal 3" − 1:28
"Antarctica Starts Here" − 2:30
"Flashback 3" − 1:55
"Sunset" − 1:07
"Get Away" − 4:37
"Antarctica 1 Does Not Equal 4" − 1:27
"Antartida Starts Here" − 2:26
"Frame Up" − 1:22
"Barn" − 4:26
"People Who Died" (Jim Carroll, Brian Linsley, Stephen Linsley, Terrell Winn, Wayne Woods) − 2:42
"Flashback 1 Does Not Equal 5" − 1:29

Personnel
John Cale − vocals and piano
Dan Buckholz − cello
Cece Giannoti − guitar on "Pasodoble Mortal"
Xavi Mezquita − trumpet on "Pasodoble Mortal"
Sterling Morrison − guitar on "People Who Died"
Guillermo Prats − electric bass on "Pasodoble Mortal"
David Soldier − arranger and conductor on "Antártida"
Chris Spedding − guitar on "People Who Died"
Erik Sanko − bass on "People Who Died"
Maureen Tucker − drums on "People Who Died"
Maurice Villavecchina − accordion on "Pasodoble Mortal"
Michael Weiss − drums on "Pasodoble Mortal"

Credits

Arranged By – John Cale (tracks: 1, 3 to 6, 8 to 20)
Artwork – Hennebert*
Cello [Cello Solos] – Dawn Buckholz
Composed By – John Cale (tracks: 1 to 18, 20)
Edited By [Digital Editing By] – Charles V.D.E.
Engineer [All Midi And Piano Recordings], Technician [Additional Treatments] – Matt Donner
Engineer [All Orchestral, Solo Cellos And Group Recordings] – Martin Brass
Executive-Producer, Edited By [Final Assembly By] – Jean-Michel Reusser
Photography By – Deborah Feingold, Maria Espeus
Producer – John Cale (tracks: 1 to 6, 8 to 20)

References

John Cale soundtracks
1995 soundtrack albums
Albums produced by John Cale